Balaenognathus (meaning "bowhead whale jaw") is an extinct genus of ctenochasmatid pterosaurs from the Late Jurassic Torleite Formation of Bavaria, Germany. The genus contains a single species, B. maeuseri, known from a nearly-complete, articulated skeleton.

Discovery and naming 

The Balaenognathus holotype specimen, NKMB P2011-633, was discovered in sediments of the Torleite Formation, dated to the upper Kimmeridgian–Tithonian ages of the late Jurassic period, near Wattendorf, Bavaria, in southern Germany. The fossil was accidentally discovered in September 2011 while crocodylomorph bones were being collected. The specimen consists of a well-preserved, nearly-complete, articulated individual. Wing membrane soft tissue is preserved in a small part of the specimen. The specimen is preserved on a slab consisting of 17 pieces, lacking only part of the left wing-finger metacarpal, the articular area of a wing-finger phalanx, including the three digits of the left wing, and a small portion of the left ilium.

In 2023, Martill et al. described Balaenognathus maeuseri, a new genus and species of ctenochasmatid pterosaurs, based on these fossil remains. The generic name, "Balaenognathus", combines a reference to the bowhead whale (Balaena mysticetus) with the Latin word "gnathus", meaning "jaw", in reference to its inferred filter feeding strategies. The specific name, "maeuseri", honours coauthor Matthias Mäuser, who died before the paper's publication.

Description

Its limb bones have similar proportions to Cycnorhamphus and Pterodaustro. Its snout is very distinctive among pterosaurs, with the rostrum tip forming a wide spatula shape. The upper jaw is curved more strongly than the upper jaw,  indicating that Balaenognathus would have been unable to entirely close its mouth. The holotype specimen has more than 480 needle-shaped teeth, with hooked tips. The teeth are limited to the sides of the jaw, while the front remains clear.

Classification 
Martill et al. (2023) recovered Balaenognathus as a member of the Ctenochasmatidae, as the sister taxon to a clade formed by Aurorazhdarcho, Gladocephaloideus, Feilongus, Moganopterus, and Lonchodectes. Their results are shown in the cladogram below:

References 

Ctenochasmatoids
Late Jurassic pterosaurs of Europe
Fossils of Germany
Jurassic Germany
Fossil taxa described in 2023